Bonaventure station is an intermodal transit station in Montreal, Quebec, Canada.

Bonaventure station may also refer to:

Bonaventure Station (1887–1952), a former train station in Montreal, Quebec, Canada
Bonaventure station (Via Rail), a former train station in Bonaventure, Quebec, Canada

See also
Bonaventura station, a light rail station in San Jose, California
Bonaventure (disambiguation)